Anthribidae is a family of beetles also known as fungus weevils. The antennae are not elbowed, may occasionally be longer than the body and thread-like, and can be the longest of any members of Curculionoidea. As in the Nemonychidae, the labrum appears as a separate segment to the clypeus, and the maxillary palps are long and projecting.

Most anthribids feed upon fungi or decaying plant matter, and the larvae feed within dead wood. Some species of Choraginae feed upon seeds, a few are stored product pests, and, unusually, Anthribus feeds upon soft scale insects.

Gallery

See also
 List of Anthribidae genera

References

External links 

 Images of Anthribidae species in New Zealand

 
Beetle families